Temptastic is the debut extended play by the South Korean girl group T-ara. It was released on December 1, 2010 through digital retailers by Core Contents Media. The EP marked the first appearance of the group's seventh member, Ryu Hwayoung.

In the works since at least late-2010, the physical album's release was originally scheduled alongside its digital release but was delayed until December 3, 2010 due to the bombardment of Yeonpyeong earlier that November.

Singles
"Wae Ireoni" was released as the lead single for Temptastic on November 23, 2010. The single is the group's first release to feature their newly added seventh member, Hwayoung. Written by label-mate Yangpa and produced by Kim Do-hoon and Lee Sang-ho, the song contains influences from 1980s synthpop and features the use of an electric guitar in the instrumental. The music video for "Wae Ireoni" premiered on November 23, 2010, the same day as the single's release. The director of the video was Lee Dae-jin, while the choreography was done by YAMA&HOTCHICKS.

"Yayaya", the EP's second single, was released alongside its parent album on December 1, 2010. In a statement regarding the abstract lyrics, E-Tribe explained: "I used the hook technique to turn the song into a sort of riddle. I wanted the unique expressions to arouse the curiosity of listeners. [...] I wanted to express the unique music through lyrics that sounded like a spell. Please don’t misunderstand it and just enjoy the exciting music." The music video features costumes and gestures (patting their hands over their mouths, finding a young man (No Min-woo) who crashed there and tying him to a stake, and living in teepees) some have called stereotypical Native American. On the December 12, 2010 broadcast of Mnet's M! Countdown, "Yayaya" won the first place spot. The song was eventually re-recorded in Japanese and released on November 30, 2011, serving as the group's second single in the territory.

Release and promotions
T-ara began  promotions for their Temptastic mini-album on December 3, 2010, performing "Wae Ireoni" alongside "Yayaya" on KBS's Music Bank. During this promotional period, T-ara's initial performance outfits failed dress regulations enforced by the music programs twice, due to short shorts or skirts worn by the group. Their staff was forced to rush out and purchase stockings or leggings at the last minute.

Track listing

Charts

Weekly charts

Year-end charts

Rankings

References 

2010 debut EPs
T-ara albums
Stone Music Entertainment EPs
Korean-language EPs